This is a list of sovereign states and other territories by population, with population figures estimated for 1 July 2005 (rounded to the nearest 1,000). The figures are estimates for the year 2005 from the U.N. World Population Prospects (2004 revision) using the medium fertility variant.

The list includes all sovereign states and dependent territories recognized by the United Nations, plus the territory under the effective control of the Republic of China (Taiwan).

This list adopts definitions of "country" on a case-by-case basis. The "United Kingdom" is considered as a single country while constituent countries of the Kingdom of the Netherlands are regarded separately.

See also
 List of countries
 List of countries by area 
 List of countries by past and future population
 List of countries by population
 List of countries by population in 1900
 List of countries by population in 2000
 List of countries by population in 2010
 List of continents by population
 List of religious populations
 World population
 Human geography

Notes

External links
United Nations Analytical Report for the 2004 revision of World Population Prospects – includes details of methodology and sources used for the population estimates above.
Population clocks & projected growth charts for all countries

2005
2005-related lists